Alexander MacDonald (1736–1791) was a Roman Catholic bishop who served as the Vicar Apostolic of the Highland District, Scotland.

Biography
Born in Bornish, South Uist in 1736, he was ordained a priest on 10 August 1764. He was appointed the Vicar Apostolic of the Highland District and Titular Bishop of Polemonium by the Holy See on 30 September 1779. He was consecrated to the Episcopate on 12 March 1780. The principal consecrator was Bishop George Hay, and the principal co-consecrator was Bishop Alexander Cameron. In 1783, he moved the seminary for the Highland District to Samalaman House. He died in office on 9 September 1791, aged 55.

See also

Catholic Church in Scotland

References

1736 births
1791 deaths
Apostolic vicars of Scotland
18th-century Roman Catholic bishops in Scotland
People from Uist